Mela Taung is the highest mountain of the Dawna Range. It is located in Kayin State, Burma, close to the border with Thailand. 

See also
List of Ultras of Southeast Asia
List of mountains in Burma

References

External links
Peakbagger Mela Taung, Myanmar
Google Books, The Physical Geography of Southeast Asia

Kayin State
Mountains of Myanmar
Dawna Range